A.B. Devendhira Poopathy, popularly known as Poopathy, is an established Tamil poet/writer. Born 18 February 1969, he has published five collections of poems so far, namely, "Peyarchol", "Velichathin Vaasanai", "Andhara Meen", "Mudivattra Nanbagal", "Aagave Naanum". His poems are immensely influenced by his in-depth knowledge in Tamil Sangam literature and his interest in philosophy.

Through ‘Kadavu’, a literary organization which he founded, he conducts various events in the interest of modern Tamil literature. He is an Additional Commissioner of State Taxes, Tamil Nadu. Kazhamputhithu literary association recently announced Mr.Poopathy is selected for the 2012, 'Kazham' puthithu award. He holds M.Com from A.P.A. College of Arts and Culture, Palani; M.Phil. from Madurai Kamaraj University, Madurai and MBA from Indira Gandhi National Open University, Delhi. His hobbies include Golf, Music and Movies. Recently during the launch of www.TamilKushi.com, his indepth spiritual knowledge was made known through his excellent speech on "why it is important to recite Vishnu Sahasranamam?"

Some variations of spellings that are used to refer B. DevendhiraPoopathy are B. DevendhiraPoopathi, Devendhira Poopathi and Devendhira Pooapthi Baskarasethupathy.

"Endless Moon" - Translation of DevendhiraPoopathy's Poems by Mugaiyur Asadha:
Devendhira Poopathy's is one of the unique, serene voices among contemporary Tamil poets and he has ascertained this with five collections of poems so far. With subtlety he generates poems as if it is painting with words. The simple, blissful yet pertinent images he creates take us to planes of imposing poetic meaning. .... Kittens began to wander about the room / when I gave my fingers to them to eat / you were seeping away through the cranny /between the doors... (Reality Presented Guest). At times the poet seems to be a caveman whose heart still in the wilderness but is seated on a vehicle which hurries on the highway and happens to run his office from a hotel room with the help of computers (Wooden Bridge). Mountains, rivers, trees, wind, wilderness, daybreak, sun, moon... all these elements of nature become inseparable from his poems. When he is perturbed, in love, or seeks asylum in philosophy after witnessing something dreadful, these elements visually form the background and quietly play up the mood. It seems the poet slyly hints at being part of these and vice-versa.                                                                                                                             
       
No   startling   revelations, no crying  out   from   the  rooftop. Poopathy is pleased to jot down his heart, as words effortlessly blend with his   meticulous observation and mature description. ....The night that born out of that salt /now drips as perspiration /like the wine that trickles/ from the periphery of words/ in the nights with endless possibilities. (The Night That Born Out Of That Salt). He is sarcastically critical and delicately reproaching too. Poems like National Circus and So You Are A Gentleman reveal us this. Beastly Warmth is a ‘one of its kind’ love poem, I daresay. His musings with philosophical undertone and delicate images entwined with succinct narration give the reader a unique poetic experience. The following lines from the poem Endless Noon may well define his poetic standpoint, ...This is a thicket of thorns/I will wander about in an era I wish/and will come to you in an unborn land. ‘What is lost in translation is poetry’ they say, however, I believe that I was able to carry over the soul of Poopathy's poems into these translations without much loss.

References

 https://web.archive.org/web/20111126130838/http://www.museindia.com/viewarticle.asp?myr=2006&issid=9&id=406
 http://www.gnanakoothan.com/2011/07/04/%E0%AE%95%E0%AE%AA%E0%AE%955/
 https://web.archive.org/web/20120201172126/http://www.kalachuvadu.com/issue-144/page55.asp
 https://web.archive.org/web/20121121000110/http://www.pudhuvisai.com/2011/10/blog-post_3878.html
 http://andhimazhai.com/news/view/seo-title-4083.html
 http://www.vikatan.com/article.php?aid=12847
 http://www.keetru.com/ungal_noolagam/sep06/devendra_boopathy.php

1969 births
Living people
Tamil writers